Paolo Baltaro (born 1967 in Genoa), is a musician, singer, songwriter, producer, and founder of Banksville Records.

Career 
As producer, he has worked with Jazz Bigbox (Banksville), Even Vast (Black Lotus), Gabriel Delta (Banksville), McAllan (Ariston), Arcansiel (Musea), Roulette Cinese (Toast), Società Anonima Decostruzionismi Organici (Btf-Ams), Mhmm (Banksville), Sorella Maldestra (Banksville), Terry Dene and Lica Cecato.

Whilst living in Italy Paolo joined the Neo Prog band Arcansiel at the time of their third album, Normality of Perversion, which was followed by Swimming in the Sand. In 2008, he formed the experimental nu-jazz quintet S.A.D.O. (Società Anonima Decostruzionismi Organici) as a spin-off of Arcansiel. 

With S.A.D.O., he was made the 12th "Tribute to Demetrio Stratos" and also won the "Darwin award of Italian non-conventional music". 

In 2010 he was awarded best progressive producer of the year by the Prog Award webzine for the conceptual bilingual album Weather Underground.
In 2008 he released Do Not Disturb, a blues album with Mhmm for Banksville Records as songwriter, producer, singer, bassist and keyboardist. 

In 2011, Baltaro released Low Fare Flight to the Earth, his solo album, as singer and composer, playing all instruments, for Musea records. Now based in London, Paolo is also the drummer of Laura Guidi and of acclaimed Italian punk band Sorella Maldestra (producer of their second album, Maltempo). 

In 2016 he released his first book in Italian, "Gli Ambienti Teorici Multidimensionali", with an English language edition available soon. In the same year he released his second solo album The Day After The Night Before and played the guitar in the Sound Wall Project album "Drunk", led by Andrea Bonizzi, with Colin Edwin of Porcupine Tree on bass and Angelo Bruschini of Massive Attack.

In 2017, he produced the original soundtrack of La Tempete, a movie by Ricky Mastro. In January 2019, he released with the S.A.D.O. Società Anonima Decostruzionismi Organici,  "Musiche per signorine da marito – Cura uditiva della narcolessia in forma Sentenziale" [38] (Banksville Records), a double experimental album, in English and Italian version in the same record, formed of nine songs (total duration: seven minutes and 30 seconds), recorded in Sentential format (song, truth, sentence). 

In August 2019 he releases with the Brazilian singer Lica Cecato "Call Porter – A time warp into Cole Porter's music", made of songs written by Cole Porter, with arrangements based on Rock, Pop, Progressive, Chill Out, Electro-Punk, Mersey Beat, Metal and various experimental stuff, including elements of Contemporary music in the same record. The record was released as "Lica Cecato and Paolo Baltaro's orchestra".

Discography
1994: Normality of Perversion (Arcansiel) (Mellow Records mmp 203)
1991: Esperimenti di Free Jazz (Quintetto Steu Battezzato) (Cd Baby)
1994: Lisciometal à Go-Go (Banksville Records pac 003) 
1994: Implosioni (Società Anonima Decostruzionismi Organici) (Banksville Records)
1995: Teratoarchetipia (Società Anonima Decostruzionismi Organici) (Banksville Records)
1999: Hear Me Out – (Even Vast) (Black Lotus Records – BLR/CD 009)
2001: La Differanza (Società Anonima Decostruzionismi Organici) (Banksville Records Creative Commons) 
2002: Herpes (McAllan) (Banksville Records Banksville Records 200145) 
2003: Che Fine Ha Fatto Baby Love (Roulette Cinese) (Toast Records tdmlc01)
2004: Swimming in the Sand (Arcansiel) (Musea fgbg 4560 ar, edizioni Universal Music)
2007: Holzvege (Società Anonima Decostruzionismi Organici) (Ams amscd122)
2008: Do Not Disturb (Mhmm) (Banksville Records 6858 – Btf)
2009: Maltempo (Sorella Maldestra) (Banksville Records 200903 – Audioglobe)
2009: Low Fare Flight to the Earth (Banksville Records) (Disco solista) (Musea fgbg 4815 ar, edizioni Universal Music)
2009: Imprescindibile Momento di Cultura Italiana (Società Anonima Decostruzionismi Organici) (Ams amscd 174 cd)
2010: Weather Underground (Società Anonima Decostruzionismi Organici) (Banksville Records 201002 – Audioglobe)
2011: The Rock Is Rolling Again con Terry Dene and Gabriel Delta (Banksville Records) (unreleased)
2012: Salutate 7 Scudetti (Sorella Maldestra) (Banksville Records 201205) 
2013: Brothers (Gabriel Delta) – (Banksville Records)
2015: Herpes (McAllan) – (Banksville Records) 200145 -ristampa- (Tastiere, chitarra ritmica, cori e Produzione)
2017: The Day After The Night Before – Original soundtracks for imaginary movies (Banksville Records) kmp 1601
2017: La Tempete – Original Soundtrack (Banksville Records) BR4500217
2018: Live Pillheads (solo record, with The Pillheads) (Banksville Records) PKMP 01791
2019: Musiche per signorine da marito – Cura uditiva della narcolessia in forma Sentenziale (Società Anonima Decostruzionismi Organici) (Banksville Records) BAA-38178
2019: Call Porter – A time warp into Cole Porter's music by Lica cecato and Paolo Baltaro's orchestra (Banksville Records) PKMP1991

Compilations 
1992: Sanscemo 92
2008: Guitars dancing in the light (Mellow Records 2008) con il medley Jingo / Moonflower / Tales Of Kilimangiaro 
2013: More Animals at the Gates of Reason – A Tribute to Pink Floyd (BTF 2013)
2013: Musiche Per Viaggiatori Distratti (compilation) (Banksville Records)

Collaborations 
 1992 – Donatella Rettore – Son Rettore e canto – (RCA Italiana/BMG Ariola) (chitarrista, per l'inedita versione del disco prodotta da Roberto Colombo)
 1992 – Gibì Franco – Ragazzo del '67 – (Pinkrecords AF349) (Productor)
 1992 – Quintetto Steu Battezzato – Esperimenti di free jazz – (Banksville Records AF0119) (Producer, saxophpnist and guitarist)
 1993 – Velivolivolanti (Alessio Bertallot) – promo – (Sound Engineer, tastiere)
 1993 – Maken B (Gianluca Mercadante) – 45gg "Droga Rock – Cosa vuol dire?" (Pinkrecords AF350) (Producer)
 1992 – Mortuary Drape – Into The Drape – Decapitated Records (Sound Engineer)
 1993 – Point of View – Misguided Confidence (Inaudito Dischi) – INAUDITO 9 (Sound Engineer)
 1994 – Opera IX The Call of the Wood – Miscarriage Records (Sound Engineer)
 1994 – Point of View Grey – Mele Marce Records (Sound Engineer)
 1995 – Chaos and Technocracy Abstract... and More – Nosferatu Records (Sound Engineer)
 1996 – Nemici dell'Igene – From Rock-a-Boom to Water Close (Banksville Records AF37128) (Guitarist)
 2000 – PG2000 – I Grandi Successi – Peoplesound Records (Sound Engineer)
 2001 – Cesare Bardelli – Remasters (Restauro)
 2002 – Toxic Poison – Nothing's Forever Banksville Records (co-producer)
 2003 – Strumpazzizzy – Notes (Szy 101) (co-produzione)
 2004 – Fabrizio Consoli – singolo L'amore non-paga, for Fred Buscaglione Jr.  (co-autore e co-produzione)
 2004 – Riarangià – Riarangià, (Co-producer and keyboards)
 2005 – Faber Per Sempre – un progetto di Per Michelatti su musica di Fabrizio De André (keyboardist)
 2006 – Toxic Poison – Cold Hate Hot Blood – Banksville Records (co-producer)
 2006 – Matrioska – Stralunatica – Produzione Pier Michelatti (Sound Engineer)
 2010 – Toxic Poison – The Beast Is Back – Banksville Records (co-producer)
 2010 – Enrico Ruggeri – Vivi (singolo) – Universal Music Italia Srl (Piano)
 2011 – Smodati – La gloria è nei momenti – Brit Beat (co-producer)
 2012 – Mauro Ermanno Giovanardi Ho Sognato Troppo L'Altra Notte? Sony Music 88697718372 
 2013 – Francesco Sarcina (El. piano engineer)
 2013 – Garrison Fewell – versione di "Everytime we say goodbye" (Cole Porter) 
 2014 – Leigh de Vries – singoli: Dead City e Saw Blade (bass, guitar, drums, producer)
 2015 – Frenky dei Rogers – singolo To You (Produzione)
 2015 – Lica Cecato – (Sound engineer)
 2017 – Sound Wall Project – (Guitarist – Co-sound engineer)
 2018 – Laura Guidi – The Point – (drums)

Publications
 Guido Michelone, Vercelli Nel Juke Box, Editrice White Light, alla voce Paolo Baltaro, pag 128 e Arcansiel, pag 128
 Massimo Forni, Lungo Le Vie Del Prog, Editrice Palladino, pag. 177
 Federico Guglielmi, Il Punk, Editrice Apache (1994), voce Sorella Maldestra
 Andrea Parentin, An introduction to Italian Progressive Rock, pag. 315
 Paolo Baltaro, Gli Ambienti Teorici Multidimensionali, Editrice Banksville Books (2016)

References

External links

 Wayback Machine
 Arcansiel
 Mhmm
 S.A.D.O.

1967 births
Living people
Italian male guitarists
Musicians from Genoa
Italian male singer-songwriters